The Player Draft for the inaugural season of the Pakistan Super League was held at Gaddafi Stadium, Lahore on 21–22 December 2015. A total of 308 players and 30 coaches, including Pakistani and Foreigners were divided into 5 different categories Platinum, Diamond, Gold, Silver and Emerging. Each franchise had a salary-spending cap of $1.2 million, including the signing of players, coaches and support staff. There were five icon players and each team was allowed to pick one icon and six foreigners in a 20-man squad (16 active and 4 supplementary).

Players per country

Players picked
Following is the list of players picked by different teams.

Shahid Afridi was the first player to be picked in draft. Shane Watson was the first foreign player to be picked in draft.

Icon
($200,000)

  Shahid Afridi
  Shoaib Malik
  Shane Watson
  Chris Gayle
  Kevin Pietersen

Platinum
($140,000)

  Sohail Tanvir
  Umar Akmal
  Misbah-ul-Haq
  Wahab Riaz
  Ahmed Shehzad
  Sarfraz Ahmed
  Dwayne Bravo
  Darren Sammy
  Andre Russell
  Shakib Al Hasan

Diamond
($70,000)

  Mohammad Hafeez
  Anwar Ali
  Kamran Akmal
  Mohammad Irfan
  Sohaib Maqsood
 Muhammad Rizwan
  Imad Wasim
  Lendl Simmons
  Samuel Badree
  Ravi Bopara
  Luke Wright
  Brad Haddin

Gold
($50,000)

  Khalid Latif
  Bilawal Bhatti
  Junaid Khan
  Mohammad Sami
  Umar Gul
  Sharjeel Khan
  Zulfiqar Babar
  Mohammad Amir
  James Vince
  Cameron Delport
  Jim Allenby
  Elton Chigumbura
  Kevon Cooper
  Tamim Iqbal

Silver
($25,000)

  Azhar Ali
  Asad Shafiq
  Sohail Khan
  Abdur Rehman
  Usama Mir
  Shahid Yousuf
  Umar Amin
  Saad Nasim
  Zohaib Khan
  Imran Khan Jr.
  Kamran Ghulam
  Mohammad Nawaz
  Zia ul Haq
  Hammad Azam
  Nauman Anwar
  Imran Khalid
  Zafar Gohar
  Bilal Asif
  Aamir Yamin
  Iftikhar Ahmed
  Babar Azam
  Mushfiqur Rahim
  Dawid Malan
  Sam Billings
  Mohammad Nabi

Emerging
($10,000)

  Adnan Rasool
  Bismillah Khan
  Hasan Ali
  Saifullah Bangash
  Amad Butt
  Naved Yasin
  Akbar-ur-Rehman
  Musadiq Ahmad
  Dawood Bashir
  Ruman Raees

Supplementary
Supplementary players are those who picked by their team as extra players and their contracts will start only after they join their teams.

Post draft signings

Management and staff
This is the list of coaches and other supportive staff hired by 5 franchises.

Islamabad United
  Wasim Akram (director/bowling coach)
  Dean Jones (head coach)
  Tauseef Ahmed (assistant coach)
  Darren Berry (fielding coach)

Peshawar Zalmi
  Mohammad Akram  (head coach)
  Andy Flower (batting consultant)
  Abdul Rehman (manager)
  Grant Luden (fielding coach/fitness trainer)
  Ibrahim Qureshi (assistant trainer)
  Bradly Lan Robinson (physiotherapist)
  Usman Hashmi (analyst)

Karachi Kings
  Mickey Arthur (head coach)
  Mushtaq Ahmed (bowling coach)
  Abdul Majeed (fielding coach)
  Asad Ali (physio)
  Muhammad Asim (analyst)

Quetta Gladiators
  Viv Richards (mentor)
  Moin Khan (head coach)
  Ian Pont (bowling coach)
  Julien Fountain (fielding coach)

Lahore Qalandars
  Rana Sabeen (manager)
  Rana Atif (CEO)
  Aqib Javed (director) 
  Paddy Upton  (head coach)
  Ijaz Ahmed (batting coach)
  Shahid Aslam (assistant coach)
  Mudassar Nazar (advisor)

References

External links 
 Tournament Site – ESPNcricinfo

2016 in Pakistani cricket
Pakistan Super League player drafts
2016 Pakistan Super League